The Kars oblast was a province (oblast) of the Caucasus Viceroyalty of the Russian Empire between 1878 and 1917. Its capital was the city of Kars, presently in Turkey. The oblast bordered the Ottoman Empire to the west, the Batum Oblast (in 1883–1903 part of the Kutaisi Governorate) to the north, the Tiflis Governorate to the northeast, and the Erivan Governorate to the east. The Kars oblast included parts of the contemporary provinces of Kars, Ardahan, and Erzurum Province of Turkey, and the Amasia Community of the Shirak Province of Armenia.

History 

The Kars oblast was a province established after the region's annexation into the Russian Empire through the Treaty of San Stefano in 1878, following the defeat of the Ottoman Empire and the dissolution of the latter's Kars, Childir and Erzurum eyalets.

With the incorporation of the region into Russian Empire, between 1879–1882 more than 110,000 people from the Kars oblast and 30,000 from the Batum oblast migrated to the new borders of the Ottoman Empire, about 80% were Muslim. In their stead, Christian settlers, mostly consisting of Armenians, Greeks and Russians, were settled throughout the province. The Armenians, who eventually came to form the largest ethnic group in the region were largely composed of immigrants from the Six Vilayets escaping persecution in the Ottoman Empire.

During the First World War, the Kars oblast became the site of intense battles between the Russian Caucasus Army supplemented by Armenian volunteer units and the Ottoman Third Army, the latter of whom was successful in briefly occupying Ardahan on 25 December 1914 before they were dislodged in early January 1915.

On 3 March 1918, in the aftermath of the October Revolution the Russian SFSR ceded the entire Kars Oblast through the Treaty of Brest-Litovsk to the Ottoman Empire, who had been unreconciled with its loss of the territory since 1878. Despite the ineffectual resistance of the Transcaucasian Democratic Federative Republic which had initially rejected the aforementioned treaty, the Ottoman Third Army was successful in occupying the Kars Oblast and expelling its more than 100,000 Armenian inhabitants.

The Ottoman Ninth Army under the command of Yakub Shevki Pasha, the occupying force of the district by the time of the Mudros Armistice, were permitted to winter in Kars until early 1919, after which on 7 January 1919 Major General G.T. Forestier-Walker ordered their complete withdrawal to the pre-1914 Ottoman-frontier. Intended to hinder the westward expansion of the fledgling Armenian and Georgian republics into the Kars Oblast, Yukub Shevki backed the emergence of the short-lived South-West Caucasus Republic with moral support, also furnishing it with weapons, ammunition and instructors.

The South-West Caucasus Republic administered the entire Kars Oblast and neighboring formerly occupied districts for three months before provoking British intervention by order of General G.F. Milne, leading to its capitulation by Armenian and British forces on 10 April 1919. Consequently, the Kars Oblast largely came under the Armenian civil governorship of Stepan Korganian who wasted no time in facilitating the repatriation of the region's exiled refugees.

Despite the apparent defeat of the Ottoman Empire, Turkish agitators were reported by Armenian intelligence to have been freely roaming the countryside of Kars encouraging sedition among the Muslim villages, culminating in a series of anti-Armenian uprisings in July 1919.

The Kars Oblast for the third time in six years saw invading Turkish troops, this time under the command of General Kâzım Karabekir in September 1920 during the Turkish-Armenian War. The disastrous war for Armenia resulted in the permanent expulsion of the region's ethnic Armenian population, many who inexorably remained befalling massacre, resulting in the region joining the Republic of Turkey through the Treaty of Alexandropol on 3 December 1920. Turkey's annexation of Kars and the adjacent Surmalu uezd was confirmed in the treaties of Kars and Moscow in 1921, by virtue of the new Soviet regime in Armenia.

After Turkey's annexation of the region, Soviet diplomat Georgy Chicherin sent a letter to the Turkish ambassador to the RSFSR, Ali Fuat Cebesoy, complaining of the violence and expulsion against Russians in Kars by Turkish authorities. For example, in the village of Novo-Mikhailovka (present-day ), the Russian population was placed into "stables and barns" and replaced by 2,000 Turkish settlers from Anatolia.

Administrative divisions 
The districts (okrugs) of the Kars Oblast in 1917 were as follows:

Demographics

Population estimate

1886

1892 

In 1892, the population of Kars Oblast was estimated as 200,868. The ethnic composition was reported as follows:

Russian Empire Census 

This number may imply that the 200,868 estimate for 1892 given by Brockhaus is too low, or that a large-scale migration from other provinces of the empire took place in between:

The 30,000 excess population of male over females was mainly attributed to the European language speakers. Among the 27,856 speakers of Russian, Ukrainian, and Belarusian, 19,910 men and 7,946 women were recorded. The Polish, and Lithuanian speakers were almost exclusively (99%) male as well; Germans and Jews, 80–90% males. This preponderance of males in the European language speakers (reported to a lesser extent in neighboring governorates as well) may indicate presence of a large numbers of soldiers or exiled persons in the region. This assumption supported by the fact that 28,875 or 9.9% of the population were military or administrative personnel.

Kavkazskiy kalendar 

See also
 Batum Oblast
 Russian Armenia
 First Republic of Armenia
 Democratic Republic of Georgia
 Treaty of San Stefano
 Treaty of Berlin (1878)

Notes

References

Bibliography

Further reading
 

 
Caucasus Viceroyalty (1801–1917)
Governorates of the Caucasus
History of Ardahan Province
History of Erzurum Province
History of Kars Province
Modern history of Armenia
States and territories established in 1878
States and territories disestablished in 1917
1878 establishments in the Russian Empire
1917 disestablishments in Russia
Soviet Union–Turkey relations